Burcu (}) is a common feminine Turkish given name. In Turkish, "Burcu" means "Scent", "Fragrance", "Redolence" and/or petrichor.

People
 Burcu Ayhan (born 1990), a Turkish high jumper
 Burcu Bircan (born 1988), a Turkish volleyball player
 Burcu Çetinkaya (born 1981), Turkish rally driver
 Burcu Dağ (born 1981), Turkish world champion para-archer
 Burcu Dolunay (born 1984), Turkish swimmer
 Burcu Düner (born 1979), Turkish-German footballer
 Burcu Erbaş (born 1988), a Turkish basketball player
 Burcu Esmersoy (born 1976), Turkish anchorwoman, journalist, occasional actress, former model
 Burcu Güneş (born 1975), a Turkish singer
 Burcu Köksal (born 1980), Turkish politician
 Burcu Özsoy (born 1976), Turkish antarctic scientist
 Burcu Pirinçci (born 1990), Turkish handball player
 Burcu Sallakoğlu (born 1987), Turkish taekwondo practitioner
 Burcu Yüksel (born 1990), Turkish high jumper

Turkish feminine given names